Ondiveeran Pagadai (or Ondi Veeran) (died 20 August 1771) was an Indian commander-in-chief who fought against the British East India Company in Tamil Nadu.

Ondiveeran came from the Arunthathiyar community and is viewed by them as a hero. Pressure from the Arunthathiyars led the Government of Tamil Nadu to build a memorial to him in Tirunelveli district. The community's efforts to obtain a monument included public protests. The foundation stone for the memorial was laid in 2011.

commemorative Postage stamp 
India Post issued a commemorative Postage stamp of Denomination Rs5 on Ondiveeran on 20.08.2022.

Memorial 
In the mid-2000s, the Dailt community in Tamil Nadu petitioned the government to establish a memorial to Ondiveeran, including public protests.The foundation stone for the memorial (which cost the government 49 lakh rupees) was laid in 2011 by Minister for Information and Public Relations Parithi Ilamvazhuthi.

References 

Indian rebels
People from Tirunelveli district
Year of birth missing
1771 deaths